Runaway Island is a 1982 Australian television film directed by Igor Auzins and starring Miles Buchanan, Simone Buchanan, Hugh Keays-Byrne, Kate Fitzpatrick, and Ron Haddrick. Set in the 1830s, it is about some wealthy children who form a gang with poor kids.

Reception 
The movie has an 7.8/10 review on IMDb

References

External links

Australian television films
1982 television films
1982 films
Films directed by Igor Auzins
1980s English-language films